Hereditary cystatin C amyloid angiopathy (HCCAA) is a rare, fatal amyloid disease in young people in Iceland caused by a mutation in cystatin C. Most of the families with the defect gene can be traced to a region in the northwest of Iceland, around Breiðafjörður.

Mutations in the cystatin 3 gene are responsible for the Icelandic type of hereditary cerebral amyloid angiopathy, a condition predisposing to intracerebral haemorrhage, stroke and dementia. The condition is inherited in a dominant fashion.

References

External links 

Vascular diseases
Neurological disorders
Health in Iceland